Mile Pajic (born 29 December 1955) is a Dutch former professional motorcycle racer. He raced in Grand Prix racing between 1984 and 1986, scoring six championship points.

Career
Pajic made his first Grand Prix start at the 500cc British Grand Prix at Silverstone in 1984. In 1985 Pajic made three Grand Prix start and scored his first points with an eight place finish at the Dutch TT. He finished a career-high 17th in the championship that year. Pajic made nine Grand Prix starts in 1986 and matched his previous best finish of eight at the Belgian Grand Prix in Spa. Pajic finished 19th in the championship that year in what would be his final season in Grand Prix racing.

After his Grand Prix career Pajic became a regular in the Superbike World Championship.

Career statistics

Grand Prix motorcycle racing

Races by year
(key) (Races in bold indicate pole position) (Races in italics indicate fastest lap)

Superbike World Championship

Races by year
(key) (Races in bold indicate pole position) (Races in italics indicate fastest lap)

Supersport World Championship

Races by year
(key) (Races in bold indicate pole position) (Races in italics indicate fastest lap)

References

External links
Mile Pajic – Profile at the official MotoGP website

1955 births
Living people
Dutch motorcycle racers
500cc World Championship riders
Superbike World Championship riders
Supersport World Championship riders
20th-century Dutch people